On the Track is debut album from Leon Redbone, released on Warner Bros. Records in 1975, and reissued on CD in 1988.

The album features a cover illustration by Chuck Jones depicting the character Michigan J. Frog.

Track listing
Side One
"Sweet Mama Hurry Home or I'll Be Gone" (Jack Neville, Jimmie Rodgers) – 2:49
"Ain't Misbehavin'" (Harry Brooks, Andy Razaf, Fats Waller) – 4:03
"My Walking Stick" (Irving Berlin) – 3:41
"Lazybones" (Hoagy Carmichael, Johnny Mercer) – 3:06
"Marie" (Irving Berlin) – 4:24

Side Two
"Desert Blues (Big Chief Buffalo Nickel)" (Jimmie Rodgers) – 3:42
"Lulu's Back in Town" (Al Dubin, Harry Warren) – 2:34
"Some of These Days" (Shelton Brooks) – 3:16
"Big Time Woman" (Wilton Crawley) – 2:44
"Haunted House" (Lonnie Johnson) – 4:58
"Polly Wolly Doodle" (Traditional) – 2:56

Personnel
Leon Redbone – vocals, guitar, harmonica
Phil Bodner – saxophone
Patti Bown – piano
Garnett Brown – trombone
Jonathan Dorn – tuba
Steve Gadd – drums
Emanuel Green – violin
Milt Hinton – double bass
Leo Kahn – violin
Ralph MacDonald – percussion, castanets
Charles Macey – guitar
Don McLean – banjo
Gene Orloff – violin
Seldon Powell – saxophone
Billy Slapin – clarinet
Joe Venuti – violin
Joe Wilder – trumpet, cornet

Production notes
Joel Dorn – producer
Bob Liftin – engineer

References

Leon Redbone albums
1975 debut albums
Albums produced by Joel Dorn
Warner Records albums